Rillaton Barrow is a Bronze Age round barrow in Cornwall, UK. The site is on the eastern flank of Bodmin Moor in the parish of Linkinhorne about four miles (6 km) north of Liskeard.

Rillaton Barrow was excavated in 1837 and found to contain a centrally-placed inhumation beneath the 25m wide barrow. The burial had been placed in a stone cist measuring 2m by almost 1m. Human remains were found along with grave goods including the Rillaton Gold Cup, a bronze dagger, beads, pottery, glass and other items.

Rillaton Gold Cup

Most notably, the burial contained the Rillaton Gold Cup, a biconical gold vessel, about 90 mm high, with a handle attached with rivets. The cup resembles a late Neolithic (approx 2300 BC) ceramic beaker with corded decoration and until 2007 was thought to date to a much later period of c. 1650-1400 BC. In 2001 the similar Ringlemere Cup was found which has a similar corded style termed grooved ware, though it was (and remains) crushed nearly flat.  Subsequent theories that it might have been deposited as a votive offering have now been abandoned in favour of it being part of the original grave goods in the Ringlemere barrow.

The cup shows an Aegean style and resembles similar finds from the Greek site of Mycenae, suggesting cultural and trading links with the Eastern Mediterranean. The Rillaton Cup and the Pelynt Dagger are two artefacts that have been found in Cornwall that have been claimed to show contact with the Mycenaean world.  However a 2006 study by Stuart Needham and others sees no reason to look so far afield for parallels, and locates them in a group with other "unstable" cups (round-bottomed and unable to stand up) in precious materials found in north-western Europe. They propose a date around 1700 BC for the Rillaton Cup, though it may have been buried a long time after it was made.  In contrast, the Pelynt Dagger might actually be Mycenaean.

After their discovery in 1837 the finds were sent as Duchy Treasure trove to King William IV, and remained in the royal household. After the death of King George V in 1936 the importance of the cup and associated dagger came to be appreciated, leading to their loan to the British Museum, where the cup remains on show next to the similar Ringlemere Cup, though still belonging to the Royal Collection. The other objects found with the cup have now disappeared, and "no useful descriptions or depictions are known"; they might well have helped assess the date. A replica of the cup is in the Royal Cornwall Museum at Truro.

A legend associated with the cup is that Rillaton is haunted by the spirit of a druid priest, who offers travellers a drink from an undrainable cup. One night a traveller threw the cup's contents at the ghost, and was later found dead in a ravine.

See also

Cornish Bronze Age
 Gold working in the Bronze Age British Isles
 Fairy cup legend

Notes

References

Sources
Needham, Stuart; Parfitt, Keith; Varndell, Gillian (Eds) The Ringlemere Cup: Precious Cups and the Beginning of the Channel Bronze Age, 2006, British Museum Research Publication 163,

External links

Bronze Age sites in Cornwall
History of Cornwall
Barrows in the United Kingdom
1837 archaeological discoveries